Rajkumar Sethupathy is an Indian actor who acts predominantly in Malayalam and Tamil films. He has acted in 50 movies in both Malayalam and Tamil films. He started his film career in the Tamil film Soolam, directed by M. Bhaskar, then with Mammotty in Thrishna, a 1981 Malayalam film. He was one of the leading actors from 1982-1988.

Early life
Rajkumar was born in Chennai in a Royal family. He is the son of producer Shanmugha Rajeswara Sethupathi and Leelarani. Tamil actress Latha is his elder sister. He has completed 2 years of acting courses at South India Film Chambers.

Personal life
He married Tamil actress Sripriya in 1988. The couple has daughter Sneha and son Nagarjun.

Filmography

As an actor

Malayalam

 Thrishna (1981)
 Poochasanyaasi (1981)
 Parvathy (1981) as Mahendra Varma
 Aranjaanam (1982) as Rajesh
 Aasha (1982) as Lal
 Akrosham (1982)
 Kazhumaram (1982)
 Pooviriyum Pulari (1982) as Johny
 Innalenkil Nale  (1982)
 Enikkum Oru Divasam (1982) as Hamsa
 Odukkam Thudakkam (1982)
 Anuraagakkodathi (1982) as Ravi
 Varanmaare Aavashyamundu (1983)
 Rathilayam (1983)
 Asthi (1983) as Krishnamoorthy
 Bhookambam (1983)
 Parasparam (1983) as Issac
 Kattaruvi (1983)
 Hello Madras Girl (1983)
 Onnu Chirikkoo (1983) as Raju
 Mahabali (1983)
 Thalaam Thettiya Thaarattu (1983)
 Unni Vanna Divasam (1984)
 Krishna Guruvaayoorappa (1984)
 Thathamme Poocha Poocha (1984)
 Vepraalam (1984)
 Vikatakavi (1984)
 Jeevitham (1984) as Chandran
 Karimbu (1984)
 Poomadhathe Pennu (1984) as Anand
 Karinagam (1985)
 Ithramathram (1986) as Ravi
 Bheekaran (1988)
 Athirthikal (1988)

Tamil
 Soolam (1980)
 Uchakattam (1980)
 Kashmir Kadhali (1983)
 Unmaigal (1983)
 Villiyanur Matha (1983)
 Anbulla Rajinikanth (1984)
 Chain Jayapal (1985)
 Aayiram Pookkal Malarattum (1986)
 Kadhal Parisu (1987)

Telugu
 Manasa Veena (1984)

As a producer
 Malini 22 Palayamkottai (2013)
 Papanasam (2015)
 Drushyam 2 (2021)

References

http://cinidiary.com/peopleinfo.php?pigsection=Actor&picata=1&no_of_displayed_rows=4&no_of_rows_page=10&sletter=R
https://web.archive.org/web/20111012211037/http://kalakkalcinema.com/tamil_news_detail.php?id=1142
http://www.malayalachalachithram.com/movieslist.php?a=4448

External links

Rajkumar at MSI

Indian male film actors
Male actors in Tamil cinema
Male actors in Malayalam cinema
Male actors in Telugu cinema
Male actors in Kannada cinema
Male actors from Chennai
Living people
Malayalam film producers
Film producers from Chennai
20th-century Indian male actors
1955 births
Telugu film producers